Never Sold Out 2 is a two disc live album by Luna Sea, released for their 25th anniversary on May 28, 2014. It is a follow-up to the 1999 live album Never Sold Out, and compiles live recordings from 1992 to 2013. It was also bundled with 25th Anniversary Ultimate Best -The One- as a "2 in 1 Box" release.

Track listing

References 

Luna Sea albums
2014 live albums
Albums recorded at the Nippon Budokan
Albums recorded at the Tokyo Dome
Albums recorded at Zepp Tokyo